Uttar Baridhara Club is a Bangladeshi football club, established in 1995, based in Kalachandpur, Baridhara, Dhaka. They currently compete in the Bangladesh Championship League, the second tier of Bangladeshi football, following relegation from the 2021–22 Bangladesh Premier League.

History

Journey to the top flight (1995–2013)
The Baridhara based team started its journey in 1995 with the help of some enthusiastic locals. Jahangir Alam was named the clubs general secretary. The club were promoted to the second division, now known as the Bangladesh Championship League, in the 2007 season after clinching the third division title. They were unlucky not to be promoted to the top-tier in their first season in the Championship league, where they finished league runners-up.

After six years fighting for promotion, Baridhara finally succeeded to do so, during the 2013 Bangladesh Championship League season. The club finished runners up behind Chittagong Abahani Limited, with 6 wins from 14 league games. The teams start striker Nabib Newaj Jibon caught the eyes of top-tier teams, with 12 goals in 13 games, he was the most prolific player for Uttar Baridhara during their promotion to the Bangladesh Premier League.

2014–present
Since 2013, the club has been promoted to Bangladesh Premiere League twice and also relegated twice. Here is the professional league records of the club:

Sponsors

Stadium 
During 2013–14 BPL season, the club used Bangabandhu National Stadium as their home venue.

Current squad
Uttar Baridhara SC squad for 2021–22 season.

Coaching staff
As of November 2021

Team records

Head coach records

Honours
Bangladesh Championship League
 Champions (1): 2015–16
 Runners-up (3): 2012, 2013, 2018–19

References

External links
 BFF page
Uttar Baridhara SC on Mycujoo

Sport in Bangladesh
Football clubs in Bangladesh